The Rother Link is a planned English canal that would connect the Chesterfield Canal at Killamarsh, via the River Rother through to the Sheffield and South Yorkshire Navigation, thus creating a new cruising ring and encouraging boats to visit the Chesterfield Canal.

Proposals
The Rother Link was first suggested in early 1995, when the Chesterfield Canal Society submitted their proposal to the National Rivers Authority for the conversion to navigable status of the  section of the River Rother from Killamarsh to Rotherham. The link has been adopted as an official goal by the Chesterfield Canal Partnership, a group of Councils at District and County level, working together with British Waterways and the Chesterfield Canal Trust. The councils consist of Derbyshire County Council, Chesterfield Borough Council, N E Derbyshire District Council, Rotherham Metropolitan Borough Council, Bassettlaw District Council and Nottinghamshire County Council.

While the connection between the Chesterfield Canal and the River Rother would have been difficult to achieve when the canal followed its original route, the need to create a diversion around housing development in Killamarsh, which has destroyed the former course, makes it much simpler. The current plans for the Chesterfield Canal reinstatement envisage the canal turning to the north and dropping down through five locks to reach Nethermoor Lake, one of four lakes that are part of the Rother Valley Country Park. From the far end of the lake, another six locks would return the level to the existing channel near Norwood. There is a relatively easy route from the lake to the Rother, which would probably require a flood lock for protection.

The route diagram shows existing roads and railways which cross the River Rother between the Rother Valley Country Park and Rotherham. Much of the route is already canalised, with the banks protected by concrete and steel piling. If the project goes ahead, old washlands and waterlogged wooded carrs would be reinstated, features that were lost when the present flood control measures were installed.

The route of the river is quite easy to follow, as the Trans Pennine Trail runs along the river bank from Rotherham to the A631 bridge, and then follows the valley to Rother Valley Country Park, on its way to Chesterfield. The Trans Pennine Trail is a long-distance footpath, connecting Liverpool, Leeds, Hull and Chesterfield, and is suitable for walking and cycling, with some sections suitable for horse riding.

Benefits
As with similar canal schemes, the Rother Valley Link would bring economic benefits to the region, which are estimated to be around £2.4 million in visitor spending per year. The link would also mean that the Chesterfield Canal was more easily accessible to boaters for which the transit of the tidal River Trent is daunting. This would follow the new link from the Rother Valley Country Park to Rotherham, pass down the River Don Navigation to Bramwith, along the Stainforth and Keadby Canal to Keadby, up the River Trent to West Stockwith, and back along the Chesterfield Canal to the country park.

Precursors
The idea of a link between the Chesterfield Canal and the River Don system is not new. Benjamin Outram, reporting to those planning the Sheffield Canal in 1793 proposed an extension to his Eckington, Beighton, Attercliffe and Tinsley route, which would use five narrow locks to join up with the Chesterfield Canal, at a cost of £4,175. Neither the main route, nor the extension were pursued. In 1810, a proposal to link Rotherham to the Chesterfield Canal was made by Richard Gresley. This was the North Eastern Junction Canal, and envisaged a link from the Chesterfield Canal to the Cromford Canal as well, but the scheme met with little enthusiasm.

In 1814, the Sheffield Canal promoters were considering two schemes, one to the north of the River Don, and one to the south, and the southern route was preferred because it would make a future link to the Chesterfield Canal easier to construct.
The idea was revived in June 1832, with a proposal for a Sheffield and Chesterfield Junction Canal, which would run from the top of the locks at Sheffield to Killamarsh forge on the Chesterfield Canal. The  canal, requiring two locks, was costed at £46,204 by the engineer Joseph Burke. A further report was made in October 1832 by George Leather, who included some improvements and revised the cost to £75,870. With no interest being shown by the River Don Navigation, the project foundered due to the failure to raise the necessary finance.

Gallery

Route

See also

Canals of Great Britain
History of the British canal system

Bibliography

References

External links

Canals in England